Victor Joseph Pike, CB, CBE (1 July 1907 – 25 February 1986) was the Anglican Bishop of Sherborne in the third quarter of the 20th century. Pike was also an international rugby union player and represented Ireland in thirteen matches.

Personal history
Pike was born in Thurles, North Tipperary in 1907. The son of clergyman William Pike and Florence Surridge, he was one of 11 children. Educated at Trinity College, Dublin and ordained in 1930  his ministry began with a  curacy at Dundrum, Dublin after which he began a long spell as a Chaplain in the British Army, rising eventually to become Chaplain-General. After his death a trust was set up to assist the sons and daughters of the clergy.

He married Dorothea Elizabeth Frend, and they had three children, Caroline (b. 1940), Jane (b. 1942) and Simon (b. 1948). In 1966, Caroline married Simon Alexander Bowes-Lyon, first cousin to Elizabeth II.

Rugby career
Pike came from a sporting family, four of his brothers played rugby union for Lansdowne. His older brother Theodore was the most notable, having represented Ireland as a prop on eight occasions between 1927 and 1928. Pike joined Lansdowne during the 1930/31 season and gained his first international cap, against England, on 14 February 1931. Ireland won narrowly, and Pike retained his place as hooker for the rest of the 1931 Five Nations Championship, a win over Scotland but a loss to tournament winners Wales. In the Scotland match, Pike scored his only international points with a try.

Pike represented Ireland a total of 13 times, all consecutive. He faced the 1931 touring South Africa team, and then played in all nine matches of the 1932, 1933 and 1934 Home Nations Championships. During the 1932/33 season, Pike was chosen to play for invitational touring team, the Barbarians.

Notes

1907 births
Alumni of Trinity College Dublin
Church of England archdeacons (military)
Bishops of Sherborne
Commanders of the Order of the British Empire
Companions of the Order of the Bath
1986 deaths
Honorary Chaplains to the Queen
20th-century Church of England bishops
World War II chaplains
Irish rugby union players
Ireland international rugby union players
Lansdowne Football Club players
Barbarian F.C. players
Rugby union hookers
Chaplains General to the Forces
British Army personnel of World War II